The African barbets are birds in the family Lybiidae. There are 43 species ranging from the type genus Lybius of forest interior to the tinkerbirds (Pogoniulus) of forest and scrubland. They are found throughout sub-Saharan Africa, with the exception of the far south-west of South Africa.

The African terrestrial barbets, Trachyphoninae, range from the southern Sahara to South Africa. Members of one genus, Trachyphonus, are the most open-country species of barbets. The subfamily Lybiinae contains the African arboreal barbets. There are 37 species of Lybiinae in 6 genera.

Description and ecology

They are mainly solitary birds, eating insects and fruit. Figs and numerous other species of fruiting tree and bush are visited. An individual barbet may feed on as many as 60 different species in its range. They will also visit plantations and take cultivated fruit and vegetables. Fruit is eaten whole and indigestible material such as seed pits regurgitated later (often before singing). Regurgitation does not usually happen in the nest (as happens with toucans), although tinkerbirds do place sticky mistletoe seeds around the entrances of their nests, possibly to deter predators. Like other barbets, they are thought to be important agents in seed dispersal in tropical forests.

As well as taking fruit, African barbets also take arthropod prey, gleaned from the branches and trunks of trees. A wide range of insects are taken, including ants, cicadas, dragonflies, crickets, locusts, beetles, moths and mantids. Scorpions and centipedes are also taken, and a few species will take small vertebrates such as lizards, frogs and geckos.

The precise nesting details of many African barbets are not yet known, although peculiarly among the Piciformes, some sociable species will nest in riverbanks or termite nests. Like many members of their order, Piciformes, their nests are in holes bored into a tree, and they usually lay between 2 and 4 eggs (except for the yellow-breasted barbet which lays up to 6), incubated for 13–15 days. Nesting duties are shared by both parents.

There has been generally little interference by humans. Some of the species which require primary woodland are declining due to deforestation, occasionally to the benefit of close relatives. For example, the loss of highland woods in Kenya has seen the moustached tinkerbird almost disappear and the red-fronted tinkerbird expand its range.

Systematics

Subfamily Lybiinae
 Genus Gymnobucco (4 species)
 Genus Stactolaema (4 species)
 Genus Pogoniulus – tinkerbirds (9 species)
 Genus Buccanodon – yellow-spotted barbets (2 species)
 Genus Tricholaema (6 species)
 Genus Lybius (12 species)

Subfamily Trachyphoninae
 Genus Trachyphonus (6 species)

It is not entirely resolved whether the Early to Middle Miocene genus Capitonides from Europe belongs to this family or the Asian barbets (now Megalaimidae). Indeed, given that the prehistoric birds somewhat resembled a primitive toucan (without these birds' present autapomorphies), they might occupy a more basal position among the barbet-toucan clade altogether. On the other hand, they show some similarities to Trachyphonus in particular and have even been placed into this genus, but this move is not widely accepted.

"CMC 152", a distal carpometacarpus similar to that of barbets and found at the Middle Miocene locality of Grive-Saint-Alban (France) was considered to differ from Capitonides in the initial description, being closer to extant (presumably Old World) barbets. This fossil is sometimes lumped into Trachyphonus too; in this case it may have more merit.

Supposed fossil remains of Late Miocene Pogoniulus were found at Kohfidisch (Austria) but are not yet thoroughly studied. It is not clear whether they belong to the extant genus but given the late date this may well be so.

Footnotes

References
 Ballmann, Peter (1969): Les Oiseaux miocènes de la Grive-Saint-Alban (Isère) [The Miocene birds of Grive-Saint-Alban (Isère)]. Geobios 2: 157–204. [French with English abstract]  (HTML abstract)
 Mlíkovský, Jirí (2002): Cenozoic Birds of the World, Part 1: Europe. Ninox Press, Prague.  PDF fulltext
 Short, L.L. & Horne, J.F.M. (2002): Family Capitonidae. In: del Hoyo, Josep; Elliott, Andrew & Sargatal, Jordi (eds.) Handbook of the Birds of the World (Volume 7: Jacamars to Woodpeckers). Lynx Edicions, Barcelona.

External links
 

Barbets

 
Bird families